Keshava is a 2017 Indian Telugu-language action thriller film written and directed by Sudheer Varma. It stars Nikhil Siddhartha in the title role along with Ritu Varma and Isha Koppikar. It revolves around a law student who wants to avenge the death of his family but suffers from a rare congenital disorder Dextrocardia, which prevents him from activities resulting in a faster heart beat. It is produced by Abhishek Nama on Abhishek Pictures banner. Dialogues were written by Krishna Chaitanya and Arjun-Carthyk, while the music was composed by Sunny M.R. and the cinematography was by Divakar Mani.

Keshava was released worldwide on 19 May 2017 in around 650 screens. It opened to positive reviews and became a  commercial success, grossing nearly 30 crore globally on a budget of 3 crore.

Plot
Chapter 1: A family travelling in a car were hit by a police jeep and left to die. Keshava wakes up in the hospital to learn that his parents were killed and his younger sister lost her legs. Keshava, now a youngster, walking in a desolate forest road and asks a biker for a lift. After a while, the biker halts to attend nature's call, and Keshava stabs him to death. Keshava is a law student with a rare heart condition, Dextrocardia, which prevents him from activities resulting in a faster heart beat. 

A fisherman witnessed the dead body of the biker hanging from a tree and informed the police. The police identify the victim as a police officer. Satyabhama attends the same college as Keshava. Satyabhama recognizes Keshava as her childhood friend, but he dismisses her and keeps avoiding her. As the police fail to find any clues, the police commissioner appoints a special branch officer, Sharmila Mishra, to investigate the case.

Chapter 2: Keshava is sipping tea in front of a police station and identifies another police officer as someone who tried to kill him and his sister in hospital. He follows the police officer on his bike and kills him in a desolate place. Sharmila finds the dead body hanging from a construction crane. Sharmila connects the dots and figures out that these two murders were done by the same person and interprets that the killer is trying to convey something. After investigation, she concludes that the killer is left-handed. Satyabhama notices Keshava writing with his left hand and remembers him doing the same in their childhood. 

Satyabhama follows him to the library and notices him reading about the murders. She manages to get the attendance register and finds out that Keshava was absent during both days of the murders. She goes to his home and makes him admit that he is her childhood friend. Keshava, Satyabhama and his friends go to Annavaram to volunteer in a temple program. Keshava comes across another police officer and recognizes him to be the one who had left his family to die after the accident. He kills the officer after a fight, but he is noticed by watchmen while returning, and one of them hits him with a stone on the back of his head. 

After returning to the accommodation, his friends confront him to confess his activities. He narrates his past, which leads him to kill some people. They decide to help him. He gets treatment for his head injury from a local doctor who informs police after watching the news about the murder and details of the suspect on TV. The next day while travelling in a bus, Sharmila apprehends him and takes him to Visakhapatnam for interrogation.

Chapter 3: Keshava denies all charges on him, and his friends destroy any evidence of his involvement. Meanwhile, a retired police officer, Krishna Murthy, is reportedly attacked by a person matching the description of the murderer. Keshava is eventually released and meets Krishna Murthy. He narrates that he is among the people responsible for the death of his parents. While returning from election duty, Nakul was driving while intoxicated and caused the accident. 

Although his colleagues requested them to save the victims, Nakul ignored them. Keshava later narrates to Sharmila that he is not avenging the accident but murder. He reveals that his parents were alive after the accident, and the policemen returned and drove over them to ensure that there won't be witnesses against them. Keshava finds another officer Bheemeswar, and kills him in broad daylight.

Chapter 4: Nakul tries to locate Keshava but fails. Sharmila gets suspicious of Krishna Murthy and confronts him, but he knocks her. Keshava is kidnapped by Nakul's henchmen, but manages to escape and kills Nakul. Krishna Murthy and Sharmila have a heated argument, and he admits that he drove the jeep at the time of the accident and is the prime culprit. He rescued Keshava from the police so that Keshava will kill Nakul and he inherits Benami properties of Nakul. 

Keshava was already on the spot when Krishna Murthy was narrating these events to Sharmila. In a subsequent chase, Krishna Murthy meets with an accident. Keshava warns him not to drink and drive, at least in his next life, and burns the car. Sharmila closes the case as an accident. Keshava starts a new life with his sister and Satyabhama.

Cast

Soundtrack

Music composed by Sunny M.R. Music released on E3 Music Company.

Reception

Critical response 
Times of India rated the film 3/5 and wrote "The movie makes for a decent watch with commendable performances and gripping screenplay." Idlebrain.com rated it 3/5 and wrote, "Keshava is a stylish revenge drama that appeals to a set of audiences."

Box office 
Keshava grossed  crore worldwide on its first three-day weekend, earning a distributor share of  crore. The film grossed  crore at the global box office.

References

External links 

Indian action thriller films
Indian films about revenge
2017 action thriller films
2010s Telugu-language films
Films directed by Sudheer Varma